Tatar Elevci is a village in the municipality of Debar, North Macedonia.

Demographics
According to the 2002 census, the village had a total of 10 inhabitants. Ethnic groups in the village include:

Macedonians 9
Albanians 1

References

External links

Villages in Debar Municipality